Yenice Çağ Private High School is one of five Özel Çağ High School branches. The school was founded in 1986 and located between the cities of Adana and Mersin, Turkey.

References

Educational institutions established in 1986
1986 establishments in Turkey
High schools in Mersin